Vítor Hugo Ribeiro Costa, known as Vítor Hugo (born 4 November 1985) is a Portuguese football player who plays for Pevidém SC.

Club career
He made his professional debut in the Segunda Liga for Desportivo das Aves on 7 January 2010 in a game against Santa Clara.

References

1985 births
Living people
People from Vila Nova de Famalicão
Portuguese footballers
G.D. Joane players
G.D. Ribeirão players
AD Oliveirense players
F.C. Tirsense players
C.D. Aves players
Liga Portugal 2 players
F.C. Vizela players
Varzim S.C. players
Vilaverdense F.C. players
Merelinense F.C. players
Pevidém S.C. players
Association football forwards
Sportspeople from Braga District